Alexander Colby Ellis (born February 10, 1993) is an American football tight end for the DC Defenders of the XFL. He was signed by the Tennessee Titans as an undrafted free agent after the 2016 NFL Draft. He played college football at Tennessee.

College career
Ellis attended the University of Tennessee, where he played as a tight end for the Tennessee football team.

Professional career

Tennessee Titans
On May 9, 2016, Ellis signed with the Tennessee Titans as an undrafted free agent. On September 2, 2016, Ellis was waived by the Titans as part of final roster cuts.

Jacksonville Jaguars
On September 5, 2016, Ellis was signed to the Jacksonville Jaguars practice squad. On November 26, 2016, he was promoted to their active roster, where he played his first NFL game against the Buffalo Bills.

On September 2, 2017, Ellis was waived by the Jaguars.

New Orleans Saints
On November 29, 2017, Ellis was signed to the New Orleans Saints' practice squad. He signed a reserve/future contract with the Saints on January 16, 2018. He was waived by the Saints on May 7, 2018.

Kansas City Chiefs
Ellis was claimed off waivers by the Kansas City Chiefs on May 8, 2018. He was waived with an injury designation by the Chiefs on October 2, 2018. After going unclaimed on waivers, the Chiefs placed him on injured reserve.

Philadelphia Eagles
On August 2, 2019, Ellis was signed by the Philadelphia Eagles. He was waived during final roster cuts on August 31, 2019, and re-signed to the team's practice squad the next day. On September 6, 2019, he was promoted to the 53-man roster as the team's third tight end. He was waived again on September 10, and re-signed to the team's practice squad on September 11. He was promoted to the team's active roster again on September 17. After suffering a knee injury in week 4 against the Green Bay Packers, Ellis was waived/injured on October 4, and subsequently reverted to the team's injured reserve list after clearing waivers on October 7. He was waived from injured reserve with an injury settlement on October 15. He was re-signed to the practice squad on December 16, 2019. He signed a reserve/future contract with the Eagles on January 6, 2020. He was waived on July 17, 2020.

New England Patriots 
Ellis was signed by the New England Patriots on August 17, 2020. He was waived on August 22, 2020.

Las Vegas Raiders
Ellis signed with the Las Vegas Raiders on June 3, 2021. He was waived on August 31, 2021.

Arizona Cardinals
Ellis was signed to the practice squad of the Arizona Cardinals on November 9, 2021. He signed a reserve/future contract with the Cardinals on January 19, 2022. He was released on July 26, 2022.

Arlington Renegades
Ellis was selected by the Arlington Renegades in the 2023 XFL Draft.

DC Defenders
The Arlington Renegades traded Ellis to the DC Defenders on March 6, 2023.

References

External links
Jacksonville Jaguars bio
Tennessee Titans bio
Tennessee Volunteers bio

1993 births
Living people
People from Sussex County, Delaware
Players of American football from Delaware
American football tight ends
Tennessee Volunteers football players
Tennessee Titans players
Jacksonville Jaguars players
New Orleans Saints players
Kansas City Chiefs players
Philadelphia Eagles players
New England Patriots players
Las Vegas Raiders players
Arizona Cardinals players
Arlington Renegades players
DC Defenders players